The North-South Dedicated Freight Corridor or North-South DFC is a proposed freight specific railway connecting New Delhi and Chennai. The approximate length of the corridor is 2,343 km with 43 proposed stations. Ministry of Railways has assigned Dedicated Freight Corridor Corporation of India (DFCCIL) to undertake Preliminary Engineering & Traffic Survey (PETS) for four additional corridors:
 East-West Corridor (Kolkata-Mumbai): 2,330 km
 North-South Corridor (Delhi-Chennai): 2,343 km
 East Coast Corridor (Kharagpur-Vijayawada): 1,100 km
 Southern Corridor (Chennai-Goa): 899 km.

It was announced by then Railway Minister Suresh Prabhu, while presenting the Railway Budget of India 2016-17. The estimated project cost is US$13 Billion. The Government has indicated that they are likely to use a foreign direct investment for funding the project. The project would be undertaken through Public Private Partnerships (PPP) model.

References

Transport in Delhi
Transport in Chennai
Dedicated freight corridors of India
Rail transport in Andhra Pradesh
Rail transport in Uttar Pradesh
Rail transport in Tamil Nadu
5 ft 6 in gauge railways in India